Gnorimoschema bacchariselloides is a moth in the family Gelechiidae. It was described by Powell and Povolný in 2001. It is found in North America, where it has been recorded from California, Montana and Alberta.

References

Gnorimoschema
Moths described in 2001